Rickard Fagerlund (born 25 January 1937 in Södertälje, Sweden, died 31 December 2009) was a Swedish ice hockey player and manager. Playing as a defenceman for Södertälje SK, he won the Swedish national championship in 1956. He also played for GAIS, IFK Norrköping and IK Oskarshamn, before coaching HC Vita Hästen.

Between 17 September 1983 and 15 June 2002, he was the chairman of the Swedish Ice Hockey Association.

References

1937 births
2009 deaths
IIHF Hall of Fame inductees
Swedish ice hockey managers
Swedish ice hockey defencemen
Södertälje SK players
Swedish ice hockey administrators
People from Södertälje
Sportspeople from Stockholm County